The 1975 All-East football team consists of American football players chosen by various selectors as the best players at each position among the Eastern colleges and universities during the 1975 NCAA Division I football season.

Offense

Quarterback
 Mike Kruczek, Boston College (AP-1)

Running backs
 Keith Barnette, Boston College (AP-1)
 Tony Dorsett, Pittsburgh (AP-1)
 Arthur Owens, West Virginia (AP-1)

Tight end
 Jim Corbett, Pitt (AP-1)

Wide receivers
 Gary Fencik, Yale (AP-1)

Tackles
 Dan Jiggetts, Harvard (AP-1)
 Dave Van Halanger, West Virginia (AP-1)

Guards
 Tom Rafferty, Penn State (AP-1)
 Pat Staub, Temple (AP-1)

Center
 Don Macek, Boston College (AP-1)

Defense

Ends
 Randy Cozens, Pittsburgh (AP-1)
 Nate Toran, Rutgers (AP-1)

Tackles
 Pete Cronon, Boston College (AP-1)
 John Quinn, Penn State (AP-1)

Middle guard
 Al Romano, Pittsburgh (AP-1)

Linebackers
 Greg Buttle, Penn State (AP-1)
 Ray Preston, Syracuse (AP-1)
 Reggie Williams, Dartmouth (AP-1)

Defensive backs 
 Chet Moeller, Navy (AP-1)
 Dennis Moorhead, Pittsburgh (AP-1)
 Tom Odell, Penn State (AP-1)

Key
 AP = Associated Press
 UPI = United Press International

See also
 1975 College Football All-America Team

References

All-Eastern
All-Eastern college football teams